"I Don't Wanna Cry" is a song recorded by American singer-songwriter Mariah Carey for her eponymous debut studio album Mariah Carey (1990). Written by Carey and producer Narada Michael Walden, Columbia Records released it as the album's fourth single in March1991. A Latin soul-influenced pop ballad, the torch song describes the end of romance. It features drums, guitars, digital synthesizers, and a prototypical song structure with highly delineated section roles. Modulations occur between these segments that emphasize the singer's emotions. Varying from whispering to belting, Carey's vocal range spans more than two octaves. 

Critics viewed "I Don't Wanna Cry" as a standout track from Mariah Carey and complimented the dynamic between Carey's vocals and Walden's production. The song received high airplay across American adult contemporary, urban contemporary, and contemporary hit radio stations. It became Carey's fourth consecutive number one on the US Billboard Hot 100 Singles chart, making her the second act to have their first four entries reach number one. The Recording Industry Association of America certified it Gold. Internationally, "I Don't Wanna Cry" reached the top ten on sales and airplay charts in Canada and the top twenty in New Zealand.

Larry Jordan directed the accompanying music video, which shows Carey and a male model brooding over their tainted relationship. His director's cut version includes scenes that Columbia thought projected a sexualized image of Carey. She performed "I Don't Wanna Cry" during the 1993 Music Box Tour, the 1996 Daydream World Tour, and the 2015 concert residency #1 to Infinity. Carey's former husband Tommy Mottola considers her lack of creative control during the production process a factor in the demise of their relationship.

Background
Then-backup singer Mariah Carey accompanied Brenda K. Starr to a record industry party in late 1988. Tommy Mottola, president of CBS Records Group, obtained Carey's demo tape at the gala and was immediately impressed by her voice. He signed Carey within a month to establish her as Columbia Records's answer to Whitney Houston of Arista Records. Mottola persuaded Arista promoter Don Ienner—who had been part of the marketing strategy that made Houston a household name—to join Columbia.

Although Carey requested to work on her debut album Mariah Carey (1990) with longtime co-writer Ben Margulies rather than well-known producers, Mottola felt it required further influences. Ienner recommended that they hire Narada Michael Walden, who had produced songs for Houston in the late 1980s and an output that connected with pop and R&B audiences. This aligned with their view of Carey as "a franchise" with an appeal to multiple demographics.

Recording
Mottola phoned Walden personally to request that he write a hit song with Carey in New York. She was apprehensive and feared that her music would become "too schmaltzy" like his work with Houston. After meeting each other, the pair held a writing session at the city's Hit Factory studio where Walden heard Carey's voice for the first time. While working on some uptempo tunes, he believed she needed a slower, melodramatic song. Influenced by recordings such as Chuck Jackson's "I Don't Want to Cry", Walden began singing a concept to Carey. They composed the melody and wrote the chorus to "I Don't Wanna Cry", after which Carey completed the remaining lyrics.

"I Don't Wanna Cry" was recorded at Tarpan Studios and The Plant Studios in California. Carey sought to redo licks multiple times during the process, and Walden agreed. After she recorded more vocals, Walden refused to incorporate them because he felt the song was complete. Mottola encouraged Carey to follow his advice but acknowledged her discontent. She never collaborated with Walden after Mariah Carey, stating, "The label was very excited for me to work with him because of his collaborations with hugely successful vocalists... it was very important for me to keep my identity as a songwriter." Carey married Mottola in 1993 and they later divorced due to his controlling nature. Retrospectively, he considers Carey's experiences with Walden how "her whole issue of feeling controlled" came into being.

Composition and lyrics

"I Don't Wanna Cry" is a torch song in the form of a Latin soul-influenced pop ballad. Like many recordings, it references the act of crying. The lyrics are simple and concern the demise of a romance: "Though I've given you my heart and soul / I must find a way of letting go / 'Cause baby, I don't wanna cry." According to David T. Farr of the Sturgis Journal, they introduce an element of vulnerability to Carey's image. Scholar Dorothy Marcic views them as an example of the progression of women's societal role as they showcase a sense of inner strength rather than victimhood like songs from previous decades.

With an introduction, verse, pre-chorus, chorus, post-chorus, bridge, and outro, "I Don't Wanna Cry" features a prototypical song structure. It is organized in compound AABA form. Set in common time, the music is played "tenderly" at a tempo of 66beats per minute according to sheet music published by Hal Leonard. It is written in the key of  until the first chorus when modulation to the relative key of  occurs. Upon the climax at the final chorus, a key change to  takes place. This alternation constructs prosody; lyrics about breaking up ("Only emptiness inside us") are in minor key while those about moving on ("I must find a way of letting go") are in major key.

Carey engages in riffing during the song's introduction. She uses a low register during verses and an upper register for the chorus. Carey's timbre varies between whispering, cooing, belting with bravura, and "raspy grit". Aside from producing, Walden plays the drums heard in "I Don't Wanna Cry". The song features an electric guitar and an acoustic guitar played by Chris Camozzi. They evoke the sound of a Spanish guitar, which was a vogue production choice at the time. The guitars are soft-sounding and play the melody while programmed keyboards are heard in the background. Walter Afanasieff worked with the keys and synth bass electronically; Ren Klyce used the Fairlight CMI digital synthesizer for rhythm programming. As with most Mariah Carey tracks, Bob Ludwig conducted mastering at Masterdisk in NewYork. The album edition of "I Don't Wanna Cry" is four minutes and forty-seven seconds long and an edited version lasts four minutes and twenty-five seconds.

Release
"I Don't Wanna Cry" is the third track on Mariah Carey, which Columbia released on June 12, 1990. It forms the record's mass market appeal along with other ballads such as "Vision of Love" and "Love Takes Time". By early 1991, the first three singles had reached number one on the US Billboard Hot 100 Singles chart and the album was in the midst of an 11-week run at number one on the Billboard 200 following Carey's Best New Artist win at the 33rd Annual Grammy Awards. 

Columbia issued "I Don't Wanna Cry" as the fourth and final single from Mariah Carey in the United States. It distributed cassettes and 7-inch vinyls to retail in March1991 with the album track "You Need Me" as a B-side. The latter song has a similar relationship separation theme, this time incorporating funk and rock music. A promotional CD includes a radio edit version. In Japan, Sony Music released "I Don't Wanna Cry" as a mini CD on May 2,1991. It is featured on Carey's compilation albums #1's (1998), Greatest Hits (2001), and #1 to Infinity (2015).

Critical reception
Critics judged "I Don't Wanna Cry" to be one of the best songs from Mariah Carey. Aside from Carey's work, it received comparisons to other ballads about relationships such as George Michael's "Careless Whisper" and Chris Isaak's "Wicked Game". Commentators considered "I Don't Wanna Cry" conventional and thought that Carey's vocal performance elevates the song's orthodoxy. Glenn Gamboa of Newsday regarded it as perhaps "the surest sign from her debut that [Carey]'s powerful voice could turn an average song into a hit" and Cleveland.com's Troy L. Smith reckoned although it might have generic production, that "doesn't stop Carey from rescuing the song with an amazing vocal".

Critics felt that Carey's vocals and the composition compliment each other and resonate emotion. According to Billboard, "Walden's grand production suits her acrobatic vocal style". Rob Tannenbaum of Rolling Stone thought that Carey's "downcast whispers animated the song's luxurious sorrow" and Vibes Julianne Shepherd said "she strikes a perfect balance between vocal ability and emotional rawness." Reviewing retrospectively, Leah Greenblatt of Entertainment Weekly graded "I Don't Wanna Cry" a B+ and Stereogums Tom Breihan scored it a 5 out of 10.

Commercial performance
In the United States, "I Don't Wanna Cry" debuted at number 50 on the Billboard Hot 100 Singles chart dated April 6,1991, as Carey's "Someday" departed the top 10. It rose from number eight to number one in the May 25,1991, issue and replaced "I Like the Way (The Kissing Game)" by Hi-Five. The song's jump to number one was the biggest since Meco's "Star Wars Theme/Cantina Band" did the same in 1977, a feat British publication Music Week deemed "unprecedented". "I Don't Wanna Cry" became Carey's fourth consecutive number one on the Hot 100. This made her the second act after the Jackson 5 in 1970 to have their first four singles reach number one and the second female artist after Paula Abdul to have four number one songs from a debut album. "I Don't Wanna Cry" spent two weeks at number one and nineteen total on the chart. , it is Carey's 11th-best performing song on the Hot 100 and Walden's final number one as a producer. 

"I Don't Wanna Cry" experienced success across multiple radio formats in the United States. The song topped at least one of the adult contemporary, urban contemporary, and contemporary hit radio charts published by Billboard, Gavin Report, or Radio & Records magazines. It received citations from performance rights organizations ASCAP and BMI for being one of the most-played songs on American radio and television stations in 1991. The Recording Industry Association of America certified it Gold in 2022, which denotes 500,000 units based on digital downloads and on-demand streams.

Outside of the United States, the song performed well in Canada. It reached the top 10 on the sales-based singles chart published by The Record ( 7) and the airplay-based chart produced by RPM ( 2). Elsewhere, "I Don't Wanna Cry" peaked at number 13 on the New Zealand singles chart and number 49 on the Australian singles chart.

Music video and performances

Carey's video album The First Vision (1991) presents a preview of the song's music video. The clip captures her singing amid red-orange lighting on an empty stage. Larry Jordan directed the official video for "I Don't Wanna Cry", which Columbia released in April1991. He had previously done so for "Someday". The sepia-toned video features Carey and an attractive man in a dark Midwestern United States home surrounded by candles and empty picture frames. After brooding over their tainted relationship, she enters a wheat field and cries. 

The video received critical commentary. According to KQED's Emmanuel Hapsis, Carey's performance foreshadows her strong acting ability in Precious (2009). People writer Drew Mackie thought her walking barefoot appears seductive. Carey disavowed the video later in her career. As Columbia reshot scenes due to the appearance of her dress and the male model, she prefers the director's cut. This version premiered on MTV in November1998 and is included on her 1999 video compilation #1's.

"I Don't Wanna Cry" is not one of Carey's fondest compositions; she has seldom performed it live. The song is noticeably absent from her 1993 high-profile Here Is Mariah Carey concert. Carey sang "I Don't Wanna Cry" during the 1993 Music Box Tour and the 1996 Daydream World Tour. Her performance of the song at the Tokyo Dome during the latter is included on her compilation album The Rarities. In 2015, Carey resumed singing "I Don't Wanna Cry" for her Las Vegas concert residency #1 to Infinity.

Credits and personnel
Credits adapted from the liner notes of Mariah Carey.

A-side: "I Don't Wanna Cry"
Locations

Personnel

Publishing

B-side: "You Need Me"
Locations

Personnel

Publishing

Charts and certifications

See also
 Billboard Year-End Hot 100 singles of 1991
 List of Billboard Hot 100 number-one singles of 1991
 List of Cash Box Top 100 number-one singles of 1991
 List of Hot Adult Contemporary number ones of 1991

Notes

References

Books

 
 
 
 
 
 

 
 
 
 
 

1990 songs
1991 singles
1990s ballads
Billboard Hot 100 number-one singles
Cashbox number-one singles
Columbia Records singles
Mariah Carey songs
Song recordings produced by Narada Michael Walden
Songs written by Mariah Carey
Songs written by Narada Michael Walden
Sony Music singles
Torch songs